Gapcheon Station is a station of the Daejeon Metro Line 1 in Wolpyeong-dong, Seo District, Daejeon, South Korea.  It has two functional platforms.  It was opened on April 17, 2007.  It is located on the river side and on the Gapcheondosi Expressway.

External links

  Gapcheon Station from Daejeon Metropolitan Express Transit Corporation

Daejeon Metro stations
Seo District, Daejeon
Railway stations opened in 2007